Procapperia is a genus of moths in the family Pterophoridae.

Species
Procapperia amira Arenberger, 1988
Procapperia ankaraica Fazekas, 2003
Procapperia hackeri Arenberger, 2002
Procapperia kuldschaensis (Rebel, 1914)
Procapperia linariae (Chrétien, 1922)
Procapperia maculatus (Constant, 1865)
Procapperia orientalis Arenberger, 1998
Procapperia pelecyntes (Meyrick, 1908)
Procapperia processidactyla Nupponen, 2022
Procapperia tadzhica Zagulajev, 2002

References

Oxyptilini
Moth genera